Saskia Keijzer-Klein is a Dutch former cricketer who played primarily as a bowler. She appeared in one One Day International for the Netherlands in 1984, the team's first, against New Zealand. Opening the bowling, Keijzer-Klein took 0/38 from 10 overs, as well as batting at number 7 and scoring 4 runs.

References

External links

Date of birth missing (living people)
Year of birth missing (living people)
Place of birth missing (living people)
Living people
Dutch women cricketers
Netherlands women One Day International cricketers